Three Blind Mice is a 1938 American romantic comedy film directed by William A. Seiter and starring Loretta Young, Joel McCrea, and David Niven that was based upon a play by Stephen Powys.

Plot
Three Kansas sisters, owners of a chicken farm, dream of a different life. Pamela (Loretta Young) pretends to be a rich lady, Moira (Marjorie Weaver) her personal maid and Elizabeth (Pauline Moore) her personal secretary. When they inherit $5872, Pam decides to head to California in search of a rich husband, which will make it much easier for her sisters to do the same. Moira and Liz do not like the idea, but Pam talks them into it.

When they check into a Santa Barbara hotel under their rehearsed roles, Steve Harrington (David Niven), who is taking a call at the front desk, is enchanted, but Pam thinks he is a gold digger, so she gives him a chilly reception. Later, Mike Brophy (Stuart Erwin), a hotel waiter, proves most informative about who is wealthy and who is not. Steve is. When Pam causes a boating accident, Steve is knocked into the water. She jumps in and pretends to be drowning, but discovers that he is in trouble himself, so she rescues him, punching him when he struggles too much. They are observed by an amused Van Dam Smith (Joel McCrea), another very rich young man. It turns out that Steve can swim; he just had trouble taking off his boots. Soon Pam has not one but two suitors. However, the money runs out, and the sisters cannot even pay their hotel bill in full. Pam pressures Moira into borrowing $100 from Mike under false pretenses.

Fortunately, Van proposes. Pam accepts and confesses everything to him. He then informs her that he is deeply in debt. His rich grandfather left all his millions in trust for his zoos and animals. She still wants to marry him, but he insists that Steve is the husband for her. He then tells Steve that he is leaving town. Steve wastes no time in proposing to Pam; she accepts. Unfortunately, when she tells Moira the news, Mike overhears everything. Disgusted, he decides to tell Steve, but the women manage to lock him in the bathroom. They quickly pack and leave for Steve's California ranch.

Steve warns them that he has an odd but well-meaning sister, Miriam (Binnie Barnes). Miriam insists they go to a nightclub to celebrate. There she picks up Van Dam Smith at the bar. When she discovers that the others already know Van, she insists he stay at their place and be best man at the wedding, much to Pam's discomfort.

Meantime Mike has followed the women and has been hired as a "personal bartender" by Miriam. When they are alone, Mike tells Pam that he will put her "on probation" and that whether or not he tells Steve depends on how she behaves; he also confesses to loving Moira. Eventually, Van can stand it no longer. He tells Pam that her wedding cannot go on. Pam weakens and they embrace. Steve comes in at this point. After Pam tells him everything about herself and her sisters, Steve realizes he has fallen in love with Elizabeth. She accepts his proposal. Then they learn that Mike married Moira the day before, and that he is wealthy too, with a 100,000 acre ranch in Montana and 15,000 head of cattle. At the end, Pamela explains to Van that "it's just that easy to fall in love with a poor man as a rich one" - the opposite of what she said to her sisters at the beginning.

Cast
 Loretta Young as Pamela Charters
 Joel McCrea as Van Dam Smith
 David Niven as Steve Harrington
 Stuart Erwin as Mike Brophy
 Marjorie Weaver as Moira Charters
 Pauline Moore as Elizabeth Charters
 Binnie Barnes as Miriam
 Jane Darwell as Mrs. Kilian
 Leonid Kinskey as Young Man
 Spencer Charters as Hendricks
 Franklin Pangborn as Clerk
 Herbert Heywood as Workman
 Elisha Cook Jr. as Boy on Bench (uncredited)

See also
 How to Marry a Millionaire, starring Marilyn Monroe, Betty Grable and Lauren Bacall as three similar schemers

External links
 
 
 

1938 romantic comedy films
American black-and-white films
American romantic comedy films
American films based on plays
Films directed by William A. Seiter
Films set in 1938  
Films set in California
20th Century Fox films
1938 films
1930s American films